Warren Jowitt (born 9 September 1974), also known by the nickname of "Woz", is an English former professional rugby league footballer who played in the 1990s and 2000s,Jowitt was known for his hard running and uncompromising defence and was a no-nonsense kind of player coached in the 2000s and 2010s.

Background
Warren Jowitt was born in Wakefield, West Yorkshire, England.

Playing career

Financial crisis at the Wakefield Trinity Wildcats
In 2000, at the height of a financial crisis at the Wakefield Trinity Wildcats, the contracts of all players aged over 24 were terminated during September 2000. The players affected were; Andy Fisher, Bobbie Goulding, Warren Jowitt, Tony Kemp (player-coach), Steve McNamara, Francis Maloney, Martin Masella, Steve Prescott, Bright Sodje, Francis Stephenson, and Glen Tomlinson.

Coaching career
He has coached at club level for Dewsbury Rams, and France (assistant) and only the second coach in the game to achieve an undefeated season.

References

External links
I want Dewsbury Rams job - Jowitt
2001 Super League Team-by-team guide
 (archived by web.archive.org) Statistics at hullfc.com
 (archived by web.archive.org) Stats → Past Players → J at hullfc.com
Dewsbury Rams part company with Warren Jowitt
 (archived by web.archive.org) Warren Jowitt leaves the Rams

1974 births
Living people
Bradford Bulls players
Dewsbury Rams coaches
Dewsbury Rams players
English rugby league players
Hull F.C. players
Rugby league locks
Rugby league props
Rugby league second-rows
Salford Red Devils players
Rugby league players from Wakefield
Wakefield Trinity players